Alfredo Aceves Martínez (born December 8, 1982) is a Mexican former professional baseball pitcher. He pitched in Major League Baseball for the New York Yankees and the Boston Red Sox.

Aceves used a fastball, which could reach the mid 90s, a curveball, a changeup, and a cut fastball. He was known for his control and his ability to throw any pitch in any count.

Career

Early career
He made ten starts in the Dominican Summer League that year. Aceves pitched for Yucatán and Sultanes de Monterrey for the next six seasons.

New York Yankees
Yankees scout Lee Sigman followed Aceves in the Mexican League, feeling he could achieve similar success as Teddy Higuera, who Sigman had signed for the Milwaukee Brewers. Feeling that he had developed well in the Mexican League, the Yankees purchased Aceves, along with Manny Banuelos and two other players, for $450,000 during the 2007–08 offseason. He began  with the Single-A Advanced Tampa Yankees. He was quickly promoted to the Double-A Trenton Thunder and Triple-A Scranton/Wilkes-Barre Yankees. He was named Eastern League pitcher of the week for the week ending May 25, 2008.

After going a combined 8–6 with a 2.62 earned run average (ERA) on the three Yankee farm teams, Aceves was called up to the Yankees on August 28, . On August 31, Aceves made his Yankee and major league debut, pitching two scoreless innings in relief as the Yankees lost to the Blue Jays, 6–2.

After pitching effectively through his first few relief appearances, Aceves was moved to the rotation in replacement of Darrell Rasner. In his first career start, he pitched seven innings of one-run ball with two strikeouts against the Los Angeles Angels of Anaheim, earning the win.

After starting the  season in the minors, Aceves rejoined the Yankees on May 4.

Due to his ability to pitch effectively in any situation, Aceves has drawn comparisons to former Yankee reliever and spot starter Ramiro Mendoza.

Aceves made ten relief appearances in 2010 before succumbing to a strained lower back that ended his season.  He suffered a broken collarbone in an off-season bicycle accident. He was non-tendered after the season.

Boston Red Sox

Aceves was signed to a major league deal by the Boston Red Sox on February 8, 2011. On April 21, he was optioned to the Triple-A Pawtucket Red Sox to make room for Matt Albers on the roster. On May 6, Aceves was called back up, and on May 16, he won his first game with the Red Sox. Between then and September 1, Aceves has a 9–1 record out of the bullpen for Boston.

After an injury to Andrew Bailey, Aceves was named the acting closer for the beginning of the 2012 season, but had a slow start, surrendering the game-winning hit on Opening Day and allowing a game-tying home run in the ninth inning of the third game of the season. In late August, once Bailey returned from his injury, he took the closer role back.

After five games in 2013, which included three starts, Aceves was optioned to Triple-A Pawtucket on April 25 two days after giving away eight runs in 3.1 innings against the Oakland Athletics. Aceves was recalled on May 24 for a one-off start against the Philadelphia Phillies. Despite the win, he was optioned to Triple-A Pawtucket on May 28. He was recalled again on June 12, and returned to Pawtucket the next day. He was recalled on July 7 when Andrew Miller suffered a year-ending foot injury. He was optioned three days later. On July 14, Aceves was outrighted off the 40-man roster after clearing waivers. He elected free agency on October 4.

Baltimore Orioles
Aceves signed a minor league deal with the Baltimore Orioles in January 2014. Aceves took a short break from 2014 Spring training to return to Mexico to obtain a work visa. After learning that he would not make the Orioles roster near the end of Spring training, Aceves elected to opt out of his contract, making him a free agent.

Second stint with the New York Yankees
Aceves signed a minor league deal with the Yankees on March 28, 2014. He received a promotion to the major leagues on May 3, and was designated for assignment on June 4. On July 3, he was suspended for 50 games for failing a drug test for recreational drugs. He was released on August 27.

Sultanes de Monterrey
Aceves signed a minor league deal with the San Francisco Giants on March 7, 2015. The Giants assigned him to the Sultanes de Monterrey of the Mexican League for the 2015 season. He was suspended for the remainder of the season in June for his confrontation with an umpire. He resigned on April 5, 2015. He was released on May 16, 2017.

Saraperos de Saltillo
On May 19, 2017, Aceves signed with the Saraperos de Saltillo of the Mexican Baseball League. He was released on July 11, 2017.

Personal life
Aceves married his wife Arley in November 2008, after proposing to her during a Trenton Thunder game during the 2008 season.  His father, Alfredo Aceves Sr., was a first baseman in the Mexican League. His older brother, Jonathan Aceves, was a minor league catcher in the Chicago White Sox organization, for the Naranjeros de Hermosillo in the Mexican Pacific League and for the Saraperos de Saltillo of the Mexican League. Aceves wears #91, a number worn by Dennis Rodman, whom Aceves admires. Aceves' son Apollo was born on August 1, 2013.

See also

List of Major League Baseball players from Mexico

References

External links

1982 births
Living people
Baseball players from Sonora
Boston Red Sox players
Gulf Coast Red Sox players
Leones de Yucatán players
Major League Baseball pitchers
Major League Baseball players from Mexico
Mexican expatriate baseball players in the United States
Mexican League baseball pitchers
New York Yankees players
Pawtucket Red Sox players
Saraperos de Saltillo players
Scranton/Wilkes-Barre RailRiders players
Scranton/Wilkes-Barre Yankees players
Sultanes de Monterrey players
Tampa Yankees players
Tomateros de Culiacán players
Trenton Thunder players
2013 World Baseball Classic players
Sportspeople from San Luis Río Colorado